Bastudalen Nature Reserve is a nature reserve in Jämtland County in Sweden.

The nature reserve consists of the mountain peak Drommen and the Dromskåran valley. The area also contains other geological remnants from the Quaternary period. The nature reserve is part of the EU-wide Natura 2000-network.

References

Nature reserves in Sweden
Natura 2000 in Sweden
Geography of Jämtland County
Tourist attractions in Jämtland County
Protected areas established in 2002
2002 establishments in Sweden